Trachodes is a genus of true weevils in the family of beetles known as Curculionidae. There are at least 30 described species in Trachodes.

Species
These 32 species belong to the genus Trachodes:

 Trachodes acanthion Schenkling, S. & Marshall, G.  A. K, 1937 c
 Trachodes acutangulus Heller, K.M., 1908 c
 Trachodes aegypticus Tournier, H., 1873 c
 Trachodes albofasciatus Ter-Minasian, 1952 c
 Trachodes asiaticus Desbr. d. Loges, 1895 c
 Trachodes borealis Schenkling, S. & Marshall, G.  A. K, 1937 c
 Trachodes contractus Klug, 1834 c
 Trachodes costatum Fåhraeus, O.I. in Schönherr, C.J., 1843 c
 Trachodes costatus Fåhraeus, 1843 c
 Trachodes elongatus Reitter, E., 1888 c
 Trachodes exsculptus Boheman, 1843 c
 Trachodes fasciculatus Schenkling, S. & Marshall, G.  A. K, 1845 c
 Trachodes heydeni Stierlin, W.G., 1881 c
 Trachodes hispidus (Linnaeus, 1758) i c g b
 Trachodes horridus Schenkling, S. & Marshall, G.  A. K, 1937 c
 Trachodes hystrix Gyllenhal, 1836 c
 Trachodes kannohi Morimoto, 2001 c
 Trachodes laoensis Kojima, 2010 c
 Trachodes monticola Morimoto & Miyakawa, 1995 c
 Trachodes oblongus Reitter, E., 1888 c
 Trachodes ovatus Weise, 1879 c
 Trachodes ovipennis Morimoto & Miyakawa, 1995 c
 Trachodes penicillatus Montrouzier, 1860 c
 Trachodes ptinoides Germar, 1824 c
 Trachodes quadrituberculatns Mannerheim, C.G., 1852 c
 Trachodes sasajii Morimoto & Miyakawa, 1995 c
 Trachodes setiger Voss, 1957 c
 Trachodes simulator Morimoto & Miyakawa, 1995 c
 Trachodes squamifer Schoenherr, 1825 c
 Trachodes subalbicollis Kojima, 2010 c
 Trachodes wakaharai Kojima, 2010 c
 Trachodes wittmeri Pesarini, 1973 c

Data sources: i = ITIS, c = Catalogue of Life, g = GBIF, b = Bugguide.net

References

Further reading

External links

 

Molytinae
Articles created by Qbugbot